Athar El-Hakim (born 24 August 1957) is an Egyptian actress.

Biography
El-Hakim attended Ain Shams University and earned a degree in English. She subsequently worked in public relations at a hotel. El-Hakim also modelled and worked as radio announcer. She was spotted by film producer Riad El-Erian, who persuaded her to embark on an acting career. El-Hakim made her acting debut in 1979, in The Killer Who Killed No One directed by Ahmed Yassin. The same year, she starred in the TV show Abnaie Al Aezzaa Shokran. El-Hakim received an award from the Arab International Radio and Television Association for her part in the show, and got a Papyrus Award for acting during a competition held by the Ministry of Culture. In 1981, she starred as an upper-class college student in I'm Not Lying But I'm Beautifying with leading actors Salah Zulfikar and Ahmed Zaki, which became her best known role.

El-Hakim was married in 1987. She began taking religious seminars in the 1990s. In 2001, El-Hakim starred in the TV series Escaping from Love as Siham, a woman who earns a Ph.D but is socially isolated. In 2002, El-Hakim refrained from taking any acting jobs while her children were at school. After the school year ended, she took them on a vacation to Syria and Lebanon. In 2003, El-Hakim resumed her acting career by playing Jaclyn Khouri in the TV series Kharaz Mulawan. It was directed by  Ahmed Khader in Lebanon and is about the Arab-Israeli conflict after the 1947 UN resolution splitting in two states.

In 2012, El-Hakim called for the cancellation of the Egyptian Shura Council. She called it ineffective and cited its costs of millions of pounds. El-Hakim retired from artistic life in 2013, after receiving tributes during the seventh edition of the Salé International Women's Film Festival.

Filmography
1979: The Killer Who Killed No One
1979: Abnaie Al Aezzaa Shokran (TV series)
1981: I’m Not Lying But I’m Beautifying
1981: Taer ala el tariq
1981: Secret Visit
1982: Man Yatfi Al-Nar
1983: Ayoub
1984: Le voyage
1984: Al Thalab W Al Enab
1985: Love on the Pyramids Plateau
1985: EL Kaf
1986: Rhythms
1987: The Upper Egyptian Man
1987: Al Zankaloni (TV series)
1987: Time Conqueror
1987: The Tiger and the Female
1988: Batal min warak
1989-1990: Al Helmeya Nights (TV series)
1990: The Last Toy
1990: Al-bahths an Al-Sayyid Marzuq
1991: Wicked Game
1991: Shaweesh Noss El Lel
1991: Al Moshaghebat w Al Captain
1994: Al-Hakika Ismoha Salem
1997: Zeezinya (TV series)
1998: Nahnou La Nazraa Al Shawk (TV series)
2001: Escaping from Love
2003: Kharaz Mulawan
2004: Friska

References

External links
Athar El-Hakim at the Internet Movie Database

1957 births
Living people
20th-century Egyptian actresses
21st-century Egyptian actresses
Egyptian film actresses
Egyptian television actresses
Ain Shams University alumni
Actresses from Cairo